Baar Baar Dekho is a 2016 Indian Hindi-language science-fiction romantic drama film directed by Nitya Mehra which marks her debut in Hindi cinema. It is produced by Karan Johar and Farhan Akhtar under Dharma Productions and Excel Entertainment respectively. The film stars Katrina Kaif and Sidharth Malhotra with Ram Kapoor and Sarika playing supporting roles. 

Plot 
Diya Kapoor and Jai Varma are childhood sweethearts. Jai is a mathematics professor and Diya, an artist. While Jai hopes to get a fellowship at Cambridge University, Diya wishes to marry her long-term boyfriend. Jai reluctantly agrees to marry her but changes his mind because of the thought of the seven vows and the billion rituals, as well as the fear of divorce. Jai criticizes these meaningless rituals and talks negatively about his marriage. He tells Diya that he has other plans for his bright future and she may not be a part of it. She walks away heartbroken. Jai gets drunk and passes out only to wake up in Thailand on his honeymoon. He discovers that it's been ten days since he married Diya. He has no memory of it at all.

Next up, in 2018, he wakes up in Cambridge, only to find his wife about to deliver their child. He discovers that it has been two years since his marriage. He realizes he has been time travelling and has no control over it.

Next time, in 2034, he wakes up, he is a professor at Cambridge University, his dream job. It has been eighteen years since his marriage. To his horror, Jai realizes that it is the day when he and Diya are divorced. Heartbroken, he returns home and pleads to return to the past to set things right.

Jai wakes up the next day, in 2023, realizing he is in the past, seven years after his marriage. He juggles many priorities of his family and career. However Jai gives more priority to work and instead of going to Diya's first art exhibition, he goes to his friend Chitra's place to help her with her breakup. Chitra tries to have an affair with Jai. Believing it to be the cause of his divorce, Jai hastily returns home, but his family is unhappy with him.

Jai is however convinced that he has set things right. The next day, in 2047, he wakes up to find himself in his 60-year-old self. He finds out that his mother had died and everyone gathered for her funeral. After the funeral, Jai is shocked that he and Diya are still divorced and that Diya had married art gallery owner Nikhil Khanna, her show opener, who enjoyed the love of Jai's mother and children.

Reeling from this blow, Jai comes across the priest who had conducted his marriage, who warns him of the importance of time. Jai is given another opportunity to set things right as he goes back in 2023 on time to the same day, seven years after his marriage. This time, he sets things right. He spends time with his children, does his work well and makes Diya feel special, and attends her art exhibition. At the end of the day, Jai is a happy man.

Jai wakes up back into the present, the day after he argued with Diya about his life and his career, got drunk, and began the long mental voyage into his future while possibly asleep. Jai rushes back to Diya, cherishing every moment along the way, also glad to see his mother again. Jai reconciles with Diya and promises to be true to her. The film ends with them marrying and everyone dancing.

Cast 
 Katrina Kaif as Diya Kapoor
 Sidharth Malhotra as Jai Varma
 Sayani Gupta as Chitra
 Kirti Adarkar as Suman
 Taaha Shah as Tarun Bhalla
 Rohan Joshi as Raj
 Rajit Kapur as Panditji (special appearance)
 Ram Kapoor as Vinod Kapoor, Diya's father
 Sarika as Varsha Varma, Jai's mother
 Sagar Arya as Nikhil Khanna, Diya's second husband in the flash-forward
 Sanjana Sanghi as a student in Jai's classroom
 Tunisha Sharma as young Diya Kapoor

Production

Development 
In October 2013, it was announced that Nitya Mehra, assistant director to films Life of Pi and The Reluctant Fundamentalist, would be making her directorial debut with Excel Entertainment on their new project. Aamir Khan and Deepika Padukone were initially attached, but both eventually left the project. Anushka Sharma was also offered the female lead but she turned it down as well. In September 2014, it was officially announced that the film will be co-produced by Karan Johar of Dharma Productions and with Sidharth Malhotra as the male lead Later in April 2015, Katrina Kaif was confirmed to feature in the film, opposite Malhotra. The film was initially titled Kal Jisne Dekha.

Filming 
Principal photography began on 28 August 2015, in Glasgow, Scotland, and went for over a month. Filming then continued in Delhi and Mumbai from November 2015 onwards. On 22 February 2016, the team filmed "Sau Aasmaan" in Krabi, Thailand, for a week.

Budget 
However, The Indian Express stated that budget was around  excluding the cost of printing & marketing which are generally not considered part of the budget.

Soundtrack 

Distributed and released by Zee Music Company in its first of a string of collaborations with Excel Entertainment, the soundtrack of Baar Baar Dekho is composed by Amaal Mallik, Arko, Badshah, Jasleen Royal, Bilal Saeed, and Prem-Hardeep, making it the first Excel Entertainment production to feature a multi-composer soundtrack. The sixth song "Kala Chashma", a recreation of an earlier Punjabi song, was released on 27 July 2016.

Release

Certification issue 
In August 2016, the film was granted a U/A certificate by the Central Board of Film Certification (CBFC). However, the examining committee of the board asked the producers to remove two visuals from the film which involved sequences depicting an actor wearing a brassiere and another referencing Savita Bhabhi, a popular Indian pornographic cartoon character.

Reception

Box office 
Baar Baar Dekho released alongside Sohail Khan's sports romantic comedy Freaky Ali and collected  on its opening day in India beating Freaky Ali's .

Critical response 

Rediff.com gave the film 1 out 5, calling it "catastrophically stupid," and commenting that "a feeble script is built on constant, relentless revelations with artlessly expository dialogues." Subhash K. Jha from NDTV gave the movie 4/5, and mentioned that there "is plenty to celebrate in Baar Baar Dekho, not the least of its virtues being the ability to deliver marital home truths without sermons or soliloquies." Writing for The Hindu, Namrata Joshi commented that the movie features "passionless performances and cardboard characters" that lack depth. "There are no standout performances, no scenes that can pack in an emotional wallop and the conversational dialogue turns banal beyond a point." The Indian Express gave the movie 1.5 out of 5, noting that "Katrina Kaif's limited emoting abilities, Sidharth Malhotra's one-note performance, and a banal script" make watching the film once "way more than enough." India Today criticized the performance of the lead actors in the film: "Katrina Kaif and Sidharth Malhotra both seem to think they are in the film to make it look good. There's hardly any acting on the part of either. While Katrina's moments of frustration and sorrow invoke the stray laugh from the theatre, Sidharth's neither-here-nor-there Jai hardly makes an impact."

Accolades

Remake 

The Australian romantic comedy Long Story Short (2021) is loosely based on this film.

References

External links 
 
 

2016 films
Films shot in Glasgow
2010s Hindi-language films
Films scored by Jasleen Royal
Films scored by Arko Pravo Mukherjee
Films scored by Badshah
Films scored by Amaal Mallik
Films scored by Bilal Saeed
2016 romantic drama films
2010s science fiction drama films
Indian romantic drama films
Films about time travel
Indian science fiction drama films
Films set in the 20th century
Fox Star Studios films
2016 directorial debut films